The Gwydir was an electoral district of the Legislative Assembly in the Australian state of New South Wales, created in 1859, when Liverpool Plains and Gwydir was divided, and named after and including the Gwydir River. In 1894 it was abolished and largely replaced by Moree and Barwon. It was re-created in the 1904 re-distribution of electorates following the 1903 New South Wales referendum, which required the number of members of the Legislative Assembly to be reduced from 125 to 90. It consisted of the abolished seat of Moree and part of Inverell. It was abolished in 1920, with the introduction of proportional representation and largely merged, along with Tamworth, into Namoi.

Members for Gwydir

Election results

References

Former electoral districts of New South Wales
Constituencies established in 1859
Constituencies disestablished in 1894
Constituencies established in 1904
Constituencies disestablished in 1920
1859 establishments in Australia
1894 disestablishments in Australia
1904 establishments in Australia
1920 disestablishments in Australia